The AS-25K is an Argentine air-to-surface missile (ASM) under development by the CITEFA (Instituto de Investigaciones Científicas y Técnicas de las FFAA - Armed Forces Scientific and Technical Research Institute) in two versions: air-to-sea and air-to-land. The main user is the COAN (COmando Aviación Naval – Naval Aviation Command) of the Argentine Navy.

It is propelled by a booster rocket and a solid propergol sustainer rocket, with a range of 25 km at a speed of Mach-2. Its total weight is less than 240 kg, and its warhead is composed by approximately 60 kg of Hexolite 50.50.

Variants
Four variants are being considered, differing basically in the guidance system:
 AS-25K-RC – Radio Commanded
 AS-25K-IR – Passive Infra-Red
 AS-25K-LS – Laser
 AS-25K-TV – Television

It has been reported that the IR version is already developed and ready for testing. Work is being done in a laser guidance system for the LS version. Research for the TV version is being commenced.

Relation with Martin Pescador
The AS-25K is a development of the Martin Pescador MP-1000 Argentine air-to-surface missile, currently in use also by the Argentine Navy. The main differences are: 
Enhanced speed and range (thanks to the booster acceleration) 
Improved guidance on height/range and azimuth (the MP-1000 can only be guided in height/range) 
Fire-and-forget guidance system (thanks to the IR seeker; the MP-1000 has only manual radioelectric guidance).
Greater range (estimated at 25 km, that's why the "25K" missile denomination).

Technical specifications
Type: Anti-ship missile/Anti-tank missile
Manufacturer: CITEFA
Diameter: ? cm (? in)
Length: ? m (? in)
Wingspan: ? cm (? in)
Standard warhead weight: 60 kg (132.3 lb)
Warhead type: Hexolite
Maximum range: 25 km (15.55 mi)
Guidance: IR or TV

See also 
CITEFA Mathogo anti-tank missile
CITEFA Martin Pescador MP-1000 air-to-surface missile
List of anti-ship missiles

References

 Information and images about this missile translated to English

External links
 Weaponry of the COAN
 CITEFA web site (also in English)

Air-to-surface missiles
Guided missiles of Argentina
Fire-and-forget weapons
Anti-ship missiles
Anti-tank guided missiles